The Kiddy Contest was a televised singing competition for children from 8 to 14 years, broadcast and organized annually by the Austrian broadcaster ORF from 1995 to 2011. It was also broadcast in Germany on ZDF, RTL and Nickelodeon. From 2012 until its final edition in 2019, the show only aired on the Austrian commercial broadcaster Puls 4. Running for 25 editions, the format was invented by the music producers Erwin Kiennast and Norman Weichselbaum.

Every year ten children from Germany, Austria and Switzerland sing a current pop hit, for which Norman Weichselbaum has written a new German text. The audience determines the winner via voting. From season 1 to 15, there were also duets.

Broadcast 
The Kiddy Contest 1996 took place on a Saturday morning in November 1996. During the 1995 and 1996 editions, the semifinals took place over the course of several weeks during the ORF / Confetti TiVi program Saturday Game moderated by Edith Rolles.

In 1997 there were separate Kiddy Contest semi-finals, which was also shown for five weeks on Saturdays in Confetti Tivi. It was moderated by Elmer Rossnegger. From 1998, there was no semifinals more on television, the pre-selection was made by a panel of experts. In 2015, the semi-finals were broadcast on the two Saturdays before the final. On both days, ten children each came and sang against each other in a duet. Only five of them each reached the final.

The Kiddy Contest was not only broadcast on ORF 1, but has also aired several times on German television, where it was freely available throughout Europe on the satellite Astra 1. In the years 2000 to 2002 the channel ZDF acted as a co-organizer of the program, during which the participants came from Germany and the program was shown on ZDF. In the years 2001 and 2002 it was transferred to KiKA. After 2002, ZDF decided not to participate anymore and the Kiddy Contest 2003 became a purely Austrian production.

Already in 2004, ORF again found a new partner. This time it was the German private channel Super RTL. The transmission scheme wasn't changed, but Super RTL was also forced to renounce the otherwise usual advertising interruptions during the show. The cooperation with Super RTL lasted until 2006.

The Kiddy Contest 2007 was again a single production of ORF. The previous specials in the lunch program were replaced by the series "Kiddy Contest – Das Camp", which was broadcast for several days in the afternoon program of ORF 1. The series documented the participation of the participants of the Kiddy Contest 2007 in Schloss Hof in Lower Austria.

In 2008 the Kiddy Contest was shown again on ORF 1 and Super RTL. The final took place on the 1 November 2008 at 20:15. The moderator of the show was again Mirjam Weichselbraun.

The Kiddy Contest 2009 was recorded in the Austria Center Vienna on 31 October 2009, and a week later on 7 November on ORF 1 at 4.45 pm. The show aired for the German fan base on the children's transmitter Nickelodeon in the German-speaking area a day later. The show was moderated by Benny Hörtnagl, star guests were Daniel Schuhmacher and Mandy Capristo (winner of season 7 / Monrose).

In 2010 the Kiddy Contest was broadcast live on ORF 1 with the new moderator Kati Bellowitsch. Nickelodeon showed a 60-minute summary a week later.

From 2012 to 2019, the private broadcaster Puls 4 secured the rights for the broadcast. The moderator of the show was Silvia Schneider from 2015 to 2018. From 2015 onwards, the program has also been broadcast via live stream on the Internet and in the Puls 4 app. Alamande Belfor has been responsible for the choreography since 2017. In 2019, Arabella Kiesbauer was the host of the show again.

In 2020 the Kiddy Contest was canceled due to the Corona pandemic. In view of the still uncertain COVID-19 pandemic situation in 2021, the producers announced on December 21, 2020 that the format would be discontinued and that the Kiddy Contest 2019, as the 25th anniversary show, was the last.

Series overview

Contestants

Season 1, 1995

Season 2, 1996

Season 3, 1997

Season 4, 1998

Season 5, 1999

Season 6, 2000

Season 7, 2001

Season 8, 2002

Season 9, 2003

Season 10, 2004

Season 11, 2005

Season 12, 2006

Season 13, 2007

Season 14, 2008

Season 15, 2009

Season 16, 2010

Season 17, 2011

Season 18, 2012

Season 19, 2013

Season 20, 2014

Season 21, 2015

Season 22, 2016

Season 23, 2017

Season 24, 2018

Season 25, 2019

Winner songs

Notes

External links

Offizielle Webpräsenz des Kiddy Contests
Artikelsammlung über den Kiddy Contest auf Medieninsider.at

Singing competitions
Singing talent shows
1995 Austrian television series debuts
2019 Austrian television series endings
1990s Austrian television series
2000s Austrian television series
2010s Austrian television series
2000s German television series
Austrian children's television series
German children's television series
German-language television shows
German music television series
ORF (broadcaster) original programming
ZDF original programming
RTL (German TV channel) original programming
Television series about children
Television series about teenagers
Recurring events established in 1995
Recurring events disestablished in 2019